The 2016 United States House of Representatives elections in Arizona were held on November 8, 2016, to elect the nine U.S. representatives from the state of Arizona, one from each of the state's nine congressional districts. The elections coincided with the 2016 U.S. presidential election, as well as other elections to the House of Representatives, elections to the United States Senate and various state and local elections. The primaries were held on August 30.

District 1 

Democrat Ann Kirkpatrick was re-elected to a second term in 2014 with 52% of the vote. She ran for the U.S. Senate in 2016 but lost to incumbent John McCain.

On the Republican side, rancher and candidate for the seat in 2014 Gary Kiehne ran again. Pinal County Sheriff Paul Babeu also ran in the primary.

Democratic primary

Candidates 
Declared
 Tom O'Halleran, former Republican state senator and independent candidate for state senate in 2014
 Miguel Olivas, former Republican congressional aide, Democratic candidate for this seat in 2012 and Libertarian candidate for AZ-03 in 2014

Withdrew
 James Maloney, small business owner

Declined
 Fred DuVal, former chairman of the Arizona Board of Regents and nominee for governor in 2014
 Catherine Miranda, state senator
 Liz Archuleta, chair of the Coconino County Board of Supervisors
 Brad Carlyon, Navajo County Attorney
 Chris Deschene, former state representative, nominee for secretary of state in 2010, and candidate for President of the Navajo Nation in 2014
 Barbara McGuire, state senator

Endorsements

Results

Republican primary

Candidates 
Declared
 Paul Babeu, Pinal County Sheriff
 Ken Bennett, former secretary of state, former president of the Arizona Senate, and candidate for governor in 2014
 Gary Kiehne, rancher, businessman and candidate in 2014
 Shawn Redd, businessman
 Wendy Rogers, former air force officer and 2014 candidate for the 9th district

Withdrew
 Carlyle Begay, state senator, dropped out and endorsed Babeu.
 David Gowan, Speaker of the Arizona House of Representatives, suspended his campaign and endorsed Kiehne

Declined
 David Tenney, director of the Arizona Residential Utility Consumer Office and former Navajo County Supervisor
 Andy Tobin, director of the Arizona Department of Weights and Measures, former Speaker of the Arizona House of Representatives and nominee for this seat in 2014

Endorsements

Results

General election

Results

District 2 

Republican Martha McSally defeated Democratic incumbent Ron Barber in 2014 with 50% of the vote.

State Representative Bruce Wheeler had formed an exploratory committee to run for the Democratic nomination, but decided not to run after having surgery to repair a torn retina.

Republican primary

Candidates 
Declared
 Martha McSally, incumbent congresswoman

Results

Democratic primary

Candidates 
Declared
 Matt Heinz, former state representative and candidate for AZ-08 in 2012
 Victoria Steele, state representative

Declined
 Ron Barber, former U.S. Representative
 David Bradley, state senator
 Fred DuVal, former chairman of the Arizona Board of Regents and nominee for governor in 2014
 Steve Farley, state senator
 Randall Friese, state representative
 Steve Kozachik, Tucson City Councilman
 Nan Walden, businesswoman, attorney and former chief of staff to Senator Bill Bradley
 Bruce Wheeler, state representative
 Paula Aboud, former state senator
 Mark Kelly, retired astronaut and husband of former U.S. Representative Gabby Giffords

Endorsements

Results

General election

Results

District 3 

Democrat Raúl Grijalva was re-elected to an eighth term in 2016 with 100% of the vote.

James K. Villarreal, a Senior Propulsion Engineer at Raytheon and University of Arizona instructor with a doctorate in aerospace engineering, formed an exploratory committee for a potential primary challenge of Grijalva. He ultimately declined to run. Edna San Miguel, an artist and former teacher, formed an exploratory committee to run for the Republican nomination. She also ultimately decided not to run, leaving Grijalva with no Republican opponent.

Grijalva faced only Libertarian write-in candidate Mike Ross in the general election. The Arizona Secretary of State reported no results for Ross.

Democratic primary

Results

General election

Results

District 4 

Republican Paul Gosar was re-elected to a third term in 2014 with 70% of the vote.

Buckeye City Councilman Ray Strauss challenged Gosar for the Republican nomination.

Republican primary

Candidates 
Declared
 Paul Gosar, incumbent congressman
 Ray Strauss, Buckeye City Councilman

Results

Democratic primary

Candidates

Declared 
 Mikel Weisser, homeless shelter administrator

Endorsements

Results

General election

Results

District 5 

The 5th District is held by Republican Matt Salmon. He did not run for reelection.

Republican primary

Candidates

Declared 
 Andy Biggs, president of the Arizona Senate
 Christine Jones, former executive vice president, general counsel and corporate secretary for GoDaddy, and candidate in the 2014 Arizona gubernatorial election
 Justin Olson, state representative
 Don Stapley, former Maricopa County Supervisor

Withdrawn 
 Bryan Martyn, former Pinal County Supervisor and state parks director

Endorsements

Polling

Results

Democratic primary

Candidates

Declared 
 Talia Fuentes, applied biologist 
 Kinsey Remaklus, real estate investor

Results

Independent

Candidates 
 Randall Sand, small business owner
 Randall Sand is/was a fake political persona created by Jake Hoffman of Rally Forge. The fake politician persona was Randall Sand, who described himself on his campaign website as an Independent Candidate for Arizona's Fifth Congressional District. His Twitter Page similarly lists him as a "Former Independent Congressional write-in candidate." Sand's Facebook presence used a photo of film director Derrick Acosta, and posted a doctored image of a Derrick Acosta interview. The Page also shared several doctored images of news story headlines purporting to be from local press featuring Randall Sand; however, the articles do not appear to exist on the newspaper sites.

General election

Results

District 6 

Incumbent Congressman David Schweikert has represented the district since being elected in 2012, and was re-elected in 2014 with 65% of the vote.

Republican primary

Candidates 
 David Schweikert, incumbent
 Russ Wittenberg

Results

Democratic primary

Candidates 
 W. John Williamson
 Brian Sinuk

Results

General election

Results

District 7 

Incumbent Congressman Ruben Gallego was first elected to this district in 2014 with 75% of the vote.

Republican primary

Candidates 
 Eve Nunez

Results

Democratic primary

Results

General election

Results

District 8 

Incumbent Congressman Trent Franks had represented the district since being elected in 2002, and was re-elected in 2014 with 75% of the vote.

Republican primary

Candidates 
 Trent Franks, incumbent
 Clair Van Steenwyk

Results

Democratic primary

Candidates 
 Joe DeVivo (write-in)

DeVivo did not receive enough write-in votes to qualify for nomination.

Results

Green Primary

Candidates 
 Mark Salazar (write-in)

Salazar qualified by receiving enough write-in votes.

General election

Results

District 9

Democratic primary

Results

Republican primary

Candidates

Declared 
 John Agra, attorney
 Dave Giles, engineer and business consultant

Agra was favored to win the Republican nomination.

Withdrawn 
 Ross Groen, retired marine. Withdrew to run for Arizona House of Representatives district 25.

Endorsements

Results

General election

Results

References

External links 
 U.S. House elections in Arizona, 2016 at Ballotpedia
 Campaign contributions at OpenSecrets

Arizona
2016
United States House of Representatives